South Mount Vernon is a census-designated place (CDP) in Knox County, Ohio, United States, adjacent to the city of Mount Vernon. It was first listed as a CDP prior to the 2020 census.

The CDP is west of the center of Knox County, in Clinton Township. It is bordered to the north, east, and south by the city of Mount Vernon. It is bordered to the southeast by Dry Creek, a northeast-flowing tributary of the Kokosing River, part of the Walhonding River and subsequently Muskingum River watersheds leading to the Ohio River.

U.S. Route 36 (Harcourt Road) runs through the west side of the community, leading north and east into Mount Vernon, and southwest  to Sunbury.

Demographics

References 

Census-designated places in Knox County, Ohio
Census-designated places in Ohio